Broz v. Cellular Information Systems Inc., 637 A.2d 148 (Del. 1996), is a US corporate law case, concerning the standard in Delaware corporations regarding conflicts of interest. It exemplifies that the Delaware courts spend considerable resources inquiring into whether a director has had an actual conflict of interest, as opposed to the traditional common law approach which demanded that there should be no possibility of a conflict.

Facts
Broz was sole shareholder and president of RFB Cellular Inc. (RFB), which held telecommunications licenses for a number of districts in Michigan.

Broz was also a non-executive board member of CIS, which operated in the same business in the upper Midwestern United States; notably it too operated in parts of Michigan.

Broz, as owner of RFB, was approached by Mackinac, a tele-license broker, who offered him another opportunity for a license in Michigan. Broz discussed the matter informally with the CIS board, but did not tell them that he had started negotiating for the license; Broz believed that CIS would not be interested in the opportunity, because at the time it was shedding licenses to try and stave off bankruptcy.

Broz was successful in obtaining the license for RFB.  Shortly thereafter, CIS avoided bankruptcy and closure by being acquired by Pri-Cellular, after which CIS sued Broz for breaching his fiduciary duty of loyalty, diverting the opportunity to himself.

Both Pri-Cellular and RFB were later absorbed by Dobson Cellular in 1998 and 2004, respectively; Dobson was itself bought out by AT&T in 2007.)

Judgment
The Delaware Supreme Court held that Broz was not under any obligation to offer the Michigan-2 licence to the CIS board, the opportunity being one that had come to him personally. The plaintiff company had lacked both the interest and the financial means to acquire the licence for itself.

See also

United States corporate law

References

External links
 

1996 in United States case law
United States corporate case law
Delaware state case law